Light-Foot is an album by jazz saxophonist Lou Donaldson recorded for the Blue Note label and performed by Donaldson's Quintet with pianist Herman Foster, bassist  Peck Morrison, drummer Jimmy Wormworth and congalero Ray Barretto.

Reception

The contemporaneous DownBeat reviewer, John S. Wilson, suggested that the material chosen for the album did not allow Donaldson's potential to be fully realized. The album was awarded 3 stars by Stephen Thomas Erlewine in an Allmusic review which stated "With Light Foot, Donaldson still was pretty firmly grounded in bop, but the tempos began to slow down, and his blues influence came to the forefront; furthermore, the bop tracks are hard bop, not straight bop, which tended to dominate his previous recordings. That diversity makes Light Foot an interesting listen, but the record suffers from slightly uneven material and performances."

Track listing
All compositions by Lou Donaldson except as indicated
 "Light-Foot" - 5:35
 "Hog Maw" - 7:39
 "Mary Ann" - 6:41
 "Green Eyes" (Nilo Menendez, Adolfo Utrera) - 5:21
 "Walking by the River" (Una Mae Carlisle, Robert Sour) - 5:39
 "Day Dreams" (Herman Foster) - 5:00
 "Stella by Starlight" (Ned Washington, Victor Young) - 5:50
Recorded at Rudy Van Gelder Studio, Hackensack, NJ on December 14, 1958.

Personnel
Lou Donaldson - alto saxophone
Herman Foster - piano
Peck Morrison - bass
Jimmy Wormworth - drums
Ray Barretto - congas

Production
 Alfred Lion - producer
 Reid Miles - design
 Rudy Van Gelder - engineer
 Francis Wolff - photography

References

Lou Donaldson albums
1959 albums
Blue Note Records albums
Albums produced by Alfred Lion
Albums recorded at Van Gelder Studio